Loch Dhu is a house in northwestern Berkeley County, South Carolina about  east of Eutawville, South Carolina. It was built around 1812–1816. It was named to the National Register of Historic Places on July 13, 1977.

History
The plantation house was probably built by Robert J. Kirk, who was a planter. The plantation was named Loch Dhu, which is Scottish Gaelic for "black lake" for a dark pond on the plantation. His son, Philip C. Kirk, inherited the plantation. The 1860 Agricultural Census listed  improved and  unimproved. He planted cotton, corn, and sweet potatoes. Philip Kirk also served in the South Carolina General Assembly from 1854 to 1864. He was a surgeon in the Confederate Army and used his plantation to nurse wounded soldiers.

When Lake Marion was constructed, many old plantation homes were lost to the waters.  The Hanover House was moved to Clemson due to its architectural significance. Loch Dhu was on higher ground and survived. It is now on a hill with Lake Marion behind.

Architecture
It is a two-story clapboard house with a hip roof. It was built around 1812. The house has a brick foundation and a one-story porch. It has two interior chimneys.

The front has two closely spaced doors that enter different rooms. There are two nine over nine lights on each side. The upper story has five nine over nine lights. The middle window is off center.  All the windows on the front elevation have shutters. The side elevations have three nine over nine lights on each level. The lower windows have shutters. The rear elevation has a modern, two-story addition. The clapboard siding has been bricked over.

The interior plan has four rooms on both levels. The first story has a drawing and dining on the front and smaller rooms in the rear with no central hallway. The upper floor has four rooms with a central hall. The floors in the house are original. The drawing and dining rooms have wainscoting, which is stained in the dining room and painted in the drawing room.

Additional pictures and a sketch of the first floor plan are available. The old separate kitchen, barn, and smokehouse remain.

References

External links

Historic American Buildings Survey in South Carolina
Houses on the National Register of Historic Places in South Carolina
Houses in Berkeley County, South Carolina
National Register of Historic Places in Berkeley County, South Carolina
Plantations in South Carolina
Plantation houses in South Carolina